Andrés Makin, Jr. (born 11 April 1992) is a Belizean professional footballer who currently plays for Belmopan Bandits and the Belize national football team as a midfielder.

He is the younger brother of fellow national team member, Devon Makin.

References

External links

Andrés Makin at Footballdatabase

1992 births
Living people
Belize international footballers
Belizean footballers
Premier League of Belize players
2013 Copa Centroamericana players
2013 CONCACAF Gold Cup players
2014 Copa Centroamericana players
2017 Copa Centroamericana players
Association football midfielders
Police United FC (Belize) players
Freedom Fighters FC players
Belmopan Bandits players
Belize under-20 international footballers
Belize youth international footballers